Marit Eli Paulsen (24 November 1939 – 25 July 2022) was a Norwegian-born Swedish journalist, author and politician for the Liberals. She was a Member of the European Parliament (MEP) from 1999 to 2004 and from 2009 to 2015. She was a well-known figure in the Swedish public debate on environmental and food quality issues, initially as a non-partisan, and was an avid proponent of Swedish membership in the European Union during the EU membership referendum campaign in 1994.

She grew up in Oslo, which was occupied by Germany during much of her earliest childhood. Two of her elder siblings were active in the youth wing of Nasjonal Samling.

She moved to Sweden in the 1960s, and worked at the steel mill in Smedjebacken for seven years. She went through a two-year Folk high school education in 1970–72. 

In 1998 she joined the Liberal People's Party, and served as 2nd Vice President of the party 1999–2007. In the 2009 European Parliament elections, she was elected to the European Parliament as top candidate of the list. She gained more personal votes than any other Swedish candidate.

Paulsen has written more than 20 books, including novels and non-fiction about environmental protection and other societal issues. Her debut novel, Du människa? (published in 1972), describes the life of a female shift worker. Her book Liten Ida (1979) is a semi-autobiographical novel set in Norway during the German occupation; it was made into a movie in 1980.

Personal life
Paulsen was married to her second husband, Sture Andersson, since 1973, and has 10 children, including biological children, step children and adopted children. She lived at a small farm in Yttermalung, Dalarna.

Paulsen died on 25 July 2022 at the age of 82.

References

External links 
Presentation of Marit Paulsen from the Swedish liberal party (Swedish)

1939 births
2022 deaths
Liberals (Sweden) politicians
Swedish Social Democratic Party politicians
Norwegian emigrants to Sweden
Liberals (Sweden) MEPs
MEPs for Sweden 1999–2004
MEPs for Sweden 2009–2014
MEPs for Sweden 2014–2019
20th-century women MEPs for Sweden
21st-century women MEPs for Sweden
Politicians from Oslo